Artur Nogueira is a city in the state of São Paulo in Brazil. It is part of the Metropolitan Region of Campinas. The population is 55,340 (2020 est.) in an area of 178.03 km². The elevation is 595 m.

The UNASP (São Paulo Seventh-Day Adventist University) is nearby.

References

Municipalities in São Paulo (state)